High Voltage was a music festival, held twice in Victoria Park, London. The event hosted artists from various strands of rock music, including classic rock, progressive rock, and heavy metal. The first festival was held on 24 and 25 July 2010. The second took place on 23 and 24 July 2011. The festival was not held in 2012 to avoid clashing with the London Olympics, and it did not return in 2013.

History

During the first festival, the Heaven and Hell set was a tribute concert to Ronnie James Dio who had died some months earlier. Jørn Lande and Glenn Hughes performed the vocals for the set.
Judas Priest played what was billed as their last UK festival appearance at the High Voltage Festival in 2011, as part of their Epitaph World Tour.

2011
The set times for 2011 were announced on 18 July 2011.

Classic Rock stage

Prog stage

Metal Hammer stage

Other
There was also an Evel Knievel exhibition; a beer festival with bands playing, including The Amber Herd who headlined on the Sunday; and the Ace Café area – featuring performances from The Crazy World of Arthur Brown (which was recorded and subsequently released on limited edition vinyl as The Crazy World of Arthur Brown Live at High Voltage), Aaron Keylock, and Allegra Shock.

Electric Wizard couldn't make the festival in time, due to flight disruptions caused by events in Norway, so Rival Sons played a headline set in their place.

2010

Classic Rock stage

Prog stage

Metal Hammer stage

Attendance over two days: around 30,000

Records

References

Music festivals in London
2010 establishments in England
Music festivals established in 2010
Heavy metal festivals in the United Kingdom